Jacobus Gerardus “Ko” Cornelissen (29 January 1904, Amsterdam - 10 December 1954, Amsterdam) was a Dutch boxer who was a six-time national champion. He won his first title at the age of 16.

Cornelissen competed in the 1924 Summer Olympics in Paris. After winning the first round by decision against Alf Johan Pedersen from Norway, he lost in the second round against Patrick “Paddy” Dwyer, alias Rocky, from Ireland.
Cornelissen was a member of D.O.S Amsterdam for 25 years, and won several National titles:
 1920	Featherweight
 1921	Lightweight
 1923	Welterweight
 1925  Unknown weight class
 1926	Middleweight
 1927	Middleweight

After his boxing career he acted for various years as a boxing referee. Shortly after the Second World War he contracted typhus and subsequently emphysema from which he died in 1954.

Jan Cornelisse
Due to sloppy administration in 1924, Cornelissen has until recently been known as "Jan Cornelisse" in official Olympic records. Of the nine Dutch boxers at the 1924 games, five  were registered under the wrong name.

References

1904 births
1954 deaths
Welterweight boxers
Olympic boxers of the Netherlands
Boxers at the 1924 Summer Olympics
Boxers from Amsterdam
Dutch male boxers